The 1965 United Nations Security Council election was held on 10 December 1965 during the twentieth session of the United Nations General Assembly, held at United Nations Headquarters in New York City. The General Assembly elected seven members, as non-permanent members of the UN Security Council for two-year mandates commencing on 1 January 1966.

Rules 

The Security Council has 15 seats, filled by five permanent members and ten non-permanent members. Each year, half of the non-permanent members are elected for two-year terms. A sitting member may not immediately run for re-election.

In accordance with the rules whereby the ten non-permanent UNSC seats rotate among the various regional blocs into which UN member states traditionally divide themselves for voting and representation purposes, the three available seats were allocated as follows:

 One for African and Asian countries
 One for Latin America and the Caribbean
 Two for the Western European and Others Group

To be elected, a candidate must receive a two-thirds majority of those present and voting. If the vote is inconclusive after the first round, three rounds of restricted voting shall take place, followed by three rounds of unrestricted voting, and so on, until a result has been obtained. In restricted voting, only official candidates may be voted on, while in unrestricted voting, any member of the given regional group, with the exception of current Council members, may be voted on.

Result 
At this time, the United Nations had 117 member states (for a timeline of UN membership, see Enlargement of the United Nations). There were no nominations before the election. The election was managed by then-President of the United Nations General Assembly Amintore Fanfani of Italy and a Mr. Wyzner of Poland and a Mr. Montero of Uruguay.
Voting was conducted on a single ballot. Ballots containing more states from a certain region than seats allocated to that region were invalidated. The United Nations was expanded from six to ten non-permanent members in 1965. As a result of the expansion, Jordan was allowed to hold membership until 31 December 1966. 

To fill the additional spots created by the expansion of the security council, four non-permanent members were elected. These seats were divided among three members from African and Asian States and one member from Western European and other States

See also 

 List of members of the United Nations Security Council
 Brazil and the United Nations
 Canada and the United Nations
 India and the United Nations

References

External links 

 UN Document A/59/881 Note Verbale from the Permanent Mission of Costa Rica containing a record of Security Council elections up to 2004

1965 elections
1965
Non-partisan elections
1965 in international relations
Security Council election